The JW Marriott Hotel Tripoli is a five star hotel in Tripoli's Central Business District. The hotel opened on February 15, 2011, days before the Libyan Civil War began. It closed just two weeks later and the hotel's few guests and 185 staff were evacuated by Marriott on a chartered plane to Amman.

References

Hotels in Tripoli, Libya
Hotels established in 2011
Hotel buildings completed in 2011